Nikolsky is a rural locality (a settlement) in Borisovsky Selsoviet, Zalesovsky District, Altai Krai, Russia. The population was 85 as of 2013. There are 4 streets.

Geography 
Nikolsky is located 24 km northeast of Zalesovo (the district's administrative centre) by road. Borisovo is the nearest rural locality.

References 

Rural localities in Zalesovsky District